Lerma is a comune (municipality) with 849 inhabitants, situated in the Province of Alessandria in the Italian region Piedmont, located about  southeast of Turin and about  south of Alessandria.

Lerma borders the following municipalities: Bosio, Casaleggio Boiro, Castelletto d'Orba, Montaldeo, Silvano d'Orba, and Tagliolo Monferrato.

History 
property of the marquises of Morbello, it passed to Genoa in 1233 ad as a fief to the Malaspina family. Feud of the Cassano Doria, under the lordship of the Montferrat pass briefly to Genoa, and then definitively to the House of Spinola. In 1691, on the death of Luca Spinola, the fiefdom passed to his daughter Maria Vittoria, wife of the Marquises Francesco Grillo. In 1708 Lerma became part of the Savoy possessions.

References

Cities and towns in Piedmont